Robert William Corddry (born February 4, 1971) is an American actor and comedian. He is known for his work as a correspondent on The Daily Show with Jon Stewart (2002–2006) and for his starring role in the film Hot Tub Time Machine. He is the creator and star of Adult Swim's Childrens Hospital and has been awarded four Primetime Emmy Awards. He previously starred in the HBO series Ballers and the CBS comedy The Unicorn.

Early life and education
Corddry was born and raised in Weymouth, Massachusetts. He is the son of Robin (née Sullivan) and Steven Corddry, who was a Massachusetts Port Authority official. He is the older brother of actor Nate Corddry. Corddry and his brother are both Eagle Scouts from Troop 19, located in Weymouth.

After graduating from Weymouth North High School (1989), Corddry went to the University of Massachusetts Amherst (1989–93). According to an interview in the UMass Amherst alumni magazine, Corddry initially planned to major in journalism but changed his major to English. By his second year, he focused much of his attention on Drama classes and plays including Torch Song Trilogy, Ten Little Indians, Cat on a Hot Tin Roof, Romeo and Juliet, and Reckless. While at UMass, Corddry pledged the Theta chapter of Theta Chi fraternity.

In January 1994, Corddry moved to New York City. His early paying jobs included working as a security guard at The Metropolitan Museum of Art and handing out menus for a Mexican restaurant. He eventually landed acting jobs, including a year-long tour with the National Shakespeare Company. He trained in improv at the Upright Citizens Brigade Theatre in New York City, performing regularly as a member of the sketch comedy group "The Naked Babies" (with John Ross Bowie, Brian Huskey, and Seth Morris); and he spent two years with the sketch comedy group "Third Rail Comedy". Corddry's first notable television appearances were on Comedy Central's Upright Citizens Brigade (1998–2000).

Career

The Daily Show
In Spring 2002, he accepted an audition for The Daily Show. His pieces for The Daily Show frequently included references to Boston, Massachusetts, which he considers to be his hometown. On October 4, 2005, his younger brother Nate Corddry made his first appearance as a Daily Show correspondent. On January 12, 2006, Corddry's wife Sandra appeared with him on a Daily Show segment; they welcomed their first child, daughter Sloane Sullivan Corddry, on July 3, 2006. On February 9, 2006 Corddry hosted an episode of The Daily Show due to the absence of Jon Stewart (jokingly because the show's regular host was "in the shop", but in fact because of the birth of Stewart's second child).

On August 15, 2006, Corddry said "I've got like a week and a half left, all bets are off", and then on August 21, 2006, Stewart remarked that Corddry's last day on The Daily Show would be August 24, 2006. Corddry appeared throughout the week, once filing a report from inside a toilet bowl supposedly on board an aircraft transporting John Mark Karr, and another dressed up in a 1970s fashion; Stewart remarked, "It's his last week, and really, we're trying to come up with terrible things for him to have to do."

During that last show on August 24, Corddry aired a self-produced tribute to his four years on the show, going out, as Stewart said, with a "poop joke".

Stewart: That was a very fitting tribute, Rob. We're gonna miss you on the show.
Corddry: Why thank you, Jon. But wherever I go and whatever I do, there'll always be a part of me here.
Stewart: Wow...that's a really sweet thing to say.
Corddry: No no no, I'm not kidding. It's in the second floor men's room, actually. That's what you get for not giving me a proper send off.
Stewart: You're really gonna go out on a poop joke?
Corddry: I have to stay true to myself, Jon.

Corddry cites Stewart as a profound influence on his comedy, crediting Stewart for teaching him how to focus on an idea in order to find the humor in it, and says that his The Daily Show pedigree earned him the clout to make Childrens Hospital.

Among the projects Corddry worked on after leaving The Daily Show was The Winner, a 2007 TV series.

Corddry has since made appearances on the show, both as a guest and as a correspondent.

Film roles
Corddry's played the title character in Blackballed: The Bobby Dukes Story (2004) and Mac, Ben Stiller's character's best friend in The Heartbreak Kid. He has also made appearances in Old School (2003, credited as Robert Corddry), Blades of Glory, Semi-Pro, I Now Pronounce You Chuck and Larry, Failure to Launch and The Ten.

He also appeared in Harold & Kumar Escape from Guantanamo Bay as Ron Fox, a neurotic and racist agent with the United States Department of Homeland Security, in W. as Ari Fleischer, and also in What Happens in Vegas. In 2010, he co-starred in the John Cusack film Hot Tub Time Machine and in 2013 he co-starred in Jonathan Levine's Warm Bodies as the zombie M.

Other work
Corddry hosted the 10th annual Webby Awards ceremony on June 12, 2006. He starred as the main character in the Fox mid-season comedy The Winner from March 4, 2007 until the series' cancellation. He described the show to Stuff Magazine as "sort of like a fucked-up Wonder Years."

Corddry has appeared in a Curb Your Enthusiasm episode entitled "The Seder" as a sex offender who moves into Larry David's neighborhood. He also appeared in two episodes of Fox's Arrested Development as Moses Taylor, an actor who plays "Frank Wrench", an obsessively by-the-books detective on a fictional television series Wrench. Corddry has also done some voice work as Gordon the animated Devil on Cartoon Network's Weighty Decisions (alongside fellow Daily Show correspondent Ed Helms). He also appeared in a commercial for Cartoon Network's Ed, Edd n Eddy series and a 2001 promotional ad as an anger management therapist to the Townsville Villains of the cartoon series The Powerpuff Girls.

Corddry's voice appears in the History Channel production World War II in HD. He is the voice of World War II soldier and jazz musician Roscoe "Rockie" Blunt.

Corddry wrote, directed, and starred in the web series Childrens Hospital for The WB on its online network at TheWB.com. After talks fell through with Comedy Central, Turner's Adult Swim picked up the series and began airing new episodes August 22, 2010.

On March 29, 2010, he was a co-guest host of WWE Raw with fellow cast member Clark Duke from Hot Tub Time Machine.

Corddry played an important role in proliferating Justin Halpern's Twitter account Shit My Dad Says. An early enthusiast of the quotes made by Halpern's father, Rob tweeted a link to Shit My Dad Says which "jump-started" the phenomenon, helping expose Halpern's Twitter feed to a larger audience.

Corddry also has starred in three commercials for the Holiday Inn in both 2010 and 2011. He appeared in three episodes of Community playing a lawyer, Alan Connor, an old acquaintance of Jeff Winger, who is also a lawyer.

In August 2011, Corddry appeared on episode 29 of the podcast Back to Work, distributed by the 5by5 podcast network, where he was interviewed by Merlin Mann about his writing and acting career.

In 2012, Corddry began a recurring role on the third season of Happy Endings, playing "The Car Czar", Jane's new boss at the car dealership. He also had a recurring role on the short-lived FOX series Ben and Kate, as Buddy, the boorish owner of the bar where Kate and BJ work, also BJ's on-and-off boyfriend.

As recently as October 2013, Rob appeared again as a recurring guest on The Jason Ellis Show. A talk show featured exclusively on SiriusXm Satellite Radio, Corddry accepted an invitation to host his own show airing on the soon to be launched "Jason Ellis Channel".

From 2015 to 2019, he starred in the HBO comedy-drama series Ballers.

He was the subject the episode #16, titled Rob, of the podcast Heavyweight by Jonathan Goldstein.

On December 3, 2019, it was revealed that Corddry would be a host of the revived Top Gear America, which debuted on Motor Trend in January 2021.

Filmography

Film

Television

Video games

Awards and honors
In 2009, Corddry was nominated for a Streamy Award Best Writing for a Comedy Web Series for Children's Hospital; in 2011, it won Best Sketch/Alternative Comedy in the first annual Comedy Awards.

References

External links

1971 births
Male actors from Massachusetts
American male comedians
American male film actors
American male video game actors
American male voice actors
American male television actors
American television writers
American male television writers
Living people
People from Weymouth, Massachusetts
University of Massachusetts Amherst alumni
20th-century American male actors
21st-century American male actors
Primetime Emmy Award winners
Upright Citizens Brigade Theater performers
Screenwriters from Massachusetts
Showrunners
20th-century American comedians
21st-century American comedians
Comedians from Massachusetts